2 Horns / 2 Rhythm is an album by American jazz trumpeter Kenny Dorham, featuring performances with Ernie Henry. It was recorded in 1957 and released on Riverside Records. This was Henry's last recording session.

Reception

The AllMusic review by Scott Yanow awarded the album four stars and stated "The sparse setting (unusual for a Dorham session) works quite well".

Track listing

Recorded in New York City on November 13 (tracks 1–3, 5–7 & 9) and December 2 (tracks 4 & 8), 1957

Personnel
Kenny Dorham – trumpet, piano (track 3)
Ernie Henry – alto saxophone
Eddie Mathias (tracks 1–3, 5–7 & 9), Wilbur Ware (tracks 4 & 8) – bass 
G.T. Hogan – drums

References 

Riverside Records albums
Kenny Dorham albums
1957 albums
Instrumental albums
Albums produced by Orrin Keepnews